Mount Andrea Lawrence — informally, Gem Peak —is a mountain, in the northern part of Yosemite National Park. It is the 17th highest mountain in Yosemite National Park. It is southeast of Tuolumne Meadows.

On Mount Andrea Lawrence's particulars

Mount Andrea Lawrence was named for Andrea Mead Lawrence, who was a conservationist, a three-time Olympian and also a former member of the Mono County Board of Supervisors.

On April 29, 2010, U.S. Senator Barbara Boxer and U.S. Representative Howard P. "Buck" McKeon announced legislation to rename Peak 12,240 in Mono County in memory of Lawrence.  On January 20, 2013, a bill was signed, by President Obama, officially naming Mount Andrea Lawrence.

Mount Andrea Lawrence is near the John Muir Trail, and is also near  Donohue Peak, Koip Peak, Blacktop Peak, Kuna Peak, Parker Peak, and Mount Wood.

References

External links and references

 A topographic map, of the area of Mount Andrea Lawrence

Mountains of Yosemite National Park
Mountains of Mono County, California
Mountains of Tuolumne County, California